Brookula calypso is a species of sea snail, a marine gastropod mollusk, unassigned in the superfamily Seguenzioidea.

Description

The height of the shell attains 1.3 mm.

Distribution
This marine species occurs off Argentina, the Falkland Islands and the Kerguelen Islands.

References

External links
 To Antarctic Invertebrates
 To Biodiversity Heritage Library (1 publication)
 To Encyclopedia of Life
 To USNM Invertebrate Zoology Mollusca Collection
 To World Register of Marine Species

calypso
Molluscs of South America
Fauna of the Falkland Islands
Fauna of the Kerguelen Islands
Molluscs of Argentina
Gastropods described in 1912